The COVID-19 pandemic in Spain had its first case in the Community of Madrid on 25 February 2020.

Timeline 
The pandemic was first confirmed to have spread to the region on 25 February 2020 with the positive result of a 24-year-old male who had been in Italy. By the time the pandemic started the region had 540 available ICUs and roughly 14,000 hospital beds.

On 9 March 2020, the Government of the Community of Madrid approved extraordinary measures, including the cancellation (to be enforced from 11 March onwards) of all in-person classes in the Autonomous community of Madrid at all educational levels for an initial period of 15 days, until 26 March, encouraging online lessons instead if possible.

On 13 March 2020 the Government of the Community of Madrid decreed the shutting down of bars, restaurants and "non-alimentary" shops (only allowing the opening of supermarkets and pharmacies). On 14 March the country-wide state of alarm for an initial period of 15 days was declared in accordance with Article 116.2 of the Spanish constitution.

On 12 March, the hiring of Antonio Burgueño as advisor was announced by the regional administration. Burgueño had previously served as Director-General for Hospitals under Manuel Lamela, Juan José Güemes and Javier Fernández-Lasquetty, and had left office after Justice blocked the latter's attempt to further privatize the health system.

During the height of the crisis (from mid March to mid April) the regional administration conducted a triage, denying the transfer to the public hospital network of old people in dire conditions from the nursing homes, yet it allowed the transfer of ill-people in possession of a private health insurance, despite the regional health minister Enrique Ruiz Escudero had assumed command over the private health care system on March 12.

On 19 March the regional minister for Social Policies, addressed a petition to the Government of Spain, asking for the intervention of the Military Emergencies Unit (UME) in the nursing homes. He was immediately disauthorized by Isabel Díaz Ayuso. Reyero was removed from the political management of the nursing homes on 26 March. Then, the regional government entrusted to Encarnación Burgueño—the daughter of Antonio Burgueño and owner of Cardio Líder (a ghost company)—the managing of the nursing home's crisis, enforcing the so-called "Operación Bicho" from 26 March onwards, attempting to provide care to the nearly 50,000 old folks in the nursing homes. 12 days later, on 6 April (the same day the information about the hiring of Burgueño Jr. was made public), the Operación Bicho was abruptly aborted. More than 3,000 old people had died during that period. All was fine for Burgueño by 4 April, as she reportedly wrote to a close collaborator "we already have inspected 8,700 grandpas". Do you know what that means? The work you have performed? Just in a week?... No way! If we keep doing this, we are becoming kings and masters of the social-health management in Madrid autonomous community. You are going to realize my dream, working in the social-health sector. Having my own company."

On 31 March 2020, two weeks after the death of 19 elderly people in a care home Monte Hermoso became public, the regional administration decided to intervene 8 private retirement homes (including the former), overwhelmed by the deadly advance of the pandemic, sometimes hidden by the companies operating the old folks' homes.

The regional legislature, the Assembly of Madrid, was kept closed for more than a month, until sessions were resumed on 14 April. The government coalition between PP and Ciudadanos showed  discrepancies on the handling of the management of the retirement homes. From 8 March to 14 April, almost 5,000 older people died in nursing homes in the region (781 confirmed cases and 4,172 with compatible symptoms).

On 7 May 2020, the director-general of public health Yolanda Fuentes resigned, apparently in protest at the regional government's decision to request a loosening of the lockdown restrictions.

On 1 June 2020,  (Ciudadanos), regional minister responsible for nursing homes at the height of the health crisis, declared he had asked for three times the regional ministry of Health (managed by Enrique Ruiz Escudero, PP) to allow the transfer of old people to hospitals (22 and 31 March, 11 April), to no success.

On 18 September, following an increase in the number of cases in the Community, the Autonomous Government decided to apply movement restrictions in various areas of the territory, especially in the south. These measures were not welcomed by the citizens of the restricted areas, calling them unfair and even racist. Neighbourhood associations and other political personalities called for demonstrations denouncing the lack of investment and calling for the resignation of the community presidency

On 26 September, the spokesperson for the COVID-19 group of the Community of Madrid, former head of the Clinical Microbiology and Infectious Diseases Service of the Gregorio Marañón University General Hospital Emilio Bouza, announced his resignation two days after his appointment, claiming that "The circumstances that I have witnessed in the following two days, together with the contemplation of the simultaneous press conferences, force me to resign". On the same day, Yolanda Fuentes, former director-general of public health of the region until her resignation on May due to disagreements with the regional government, published a social media post wishing "Good luck" followed by an extract from the film Titanic, where musicians kept playing while the boat was sinking.

On 1 October, followed unsuccessful conversations between the central government and the autonomous government, the Minister of Health of Spain announced restrictions in the ten most populous cities of the region following the growing of COVID cases, which prompted a negative reaction from the Madrilenian president, that accused the national government of "usurpation of functions", but said her government would abide by the restrictions, although they would challenge them in court.

On 3 October, Alberto Reyero, the regional minister responsible for nursing homes announced his resignation, wishing "good luck and success in the task that she has ahead" to Díaz Ayuso. He also mentioned that "the unity of the institutions is the most successful way to defeat the virus", criticizing the confrontation between the regional and national administrations.

On 9 October, following unsuccessful talks and confrontation between Díaz Ayuso and PM Pedro Sánchez, the Spanish government approved a State of Alarm for the Community of Madrid.

On 20 October 2020, two health officials of the Ayuso administration (the manager of Primary Attention and the manager of Hospitals) handed in their resignation.

Statistics

Patients currently in an ICU

Cumulative data
Data from Telemadrid and the Ministry of Health.

References

External links

Madrid
2020 in the Community of Madrid